Joe Walker (born 1944) is an American Zydeco singer and accordionist.

Biography
Walker began his career in the wake of Clifton Chenier, and became the star of Zydeco of the late 20th century, thanks to albums such as Zydeco Fever and In the Dog House, edited by Zane Records.

Style
Walker has a powerful voice with a rich texture.  His style is heavily influenced by gospel music.

References

1944 births
Living people
Musicians from Lafayette, Louisiana
Zydeco accordionists
Blues musicians from Louisiana
American blues singers
Singers from Louisiana
21st-century accordionists